Robert Brigham may refer to:

Robert Brigham (died 1349), MP for Cambridge
Robert Brigham (fl. 1377–1402), MP for Cambridge and son of the above
Robert K. Brigham, American historian